On March 1 2014, a group of 8 knife-wielding terrorists attacked passengers in the Kunming Railway Station in Kunming, Yunnan, China, killing 31 people, and wounding 143 others. The attackers pulled out long-bladed knives and stabbed and slashed passengers at random.  Four assailants were shot to death by police on the spot and one injured perpetrator was captured. Police announced on 3 March that the six-man, two-woman group had been neutralized after the arrest of three remaining suspects.

No group claimed responsibility for the attack and no ties to any organization have been identified, in effect the group was a singular terror cell. Xinhua News Agency and the government of Kunming said that the attack had been linked to Sunni extremists which were a faction of Xinjiang separatists. Police said that they had confiscated a black, hand-painted East Turkestan flag at the scene, which is associated with the Uyghur separatists from the Xinjiang Uyghur Autonomous Region.

Attack
At 21:20 on 1 March 2014, a group of individuals dressed in black clothes rushed into the square and ticket lobby of Kunming railway station and started to attack people indiscriminately. Initial reports indicated there were ten assailants armed with knives and cleavers.

The assailants killed 31 people and injured 143 (including seven policemen). Two security guards employed by the station were among the dead. The wounded were treated at 11 hospitals in Kunming. Police initially attempted to subdue the attackers using tear-gas shells but were unable to do so, before shooting four suspects and arresting one. A wounded female suspect was detained at the scene and sent to a hospital.

China News Service quoted a "Mr. Tan", who remembered seven to eight attackers indiscriminately slashing people regardless of age, even stabbing the wounded on the floor until they were dead. He also saw a police officer carrying a child of about five years of age, with slashed trousers and blood streaming down their legs.

Initial response
According to China Central Television, a four-man SWAT team was on site within ten minutes of the start of the knife attack. The sole member of the team with an automatic weapon shot five of the attackers in rapid succession, killing four of them, after two warning shots were fired.
After the incident, all trains originally scheduled to stop at Kunming Station were directed to stop elsewhere until 23:00 on 1 March when services gradually resumed. Personnel at the Changshui International Airport also held an emergency meeting and tightened security though they stated that they were operating normally. There were scattered news reports suggesting that similar attacks occurred in Dashuying in the Jinma subdistrict of Kunming, but local police stated that reports of "several places suffering attacks" were only rumors.

The Red Cross Society of China sent a team to Yunnan in the morning of 2 March to support the Yunnan Red Cross Society in assisting with rescue efforts and to provide counseling to the relatives of victims and shocked civilians.

On 2 March, armed police patrolled the area around Kunming Railway Station. In the early morning, locals put flowers on the square in front of the station to mourn the dead. At 13:00, the Kunming Police disclosed information on two suspects, one woman and one man, according to statements of witnesses.

In the aftermath of the attack, heavy police presence was noted in Dashuying, a low-income ghetto that houses many of Kunming's Uyghurs. Kunming police interrogated members of the small local Uyghur community, questioning them at gunpoint.

Yunnan's Communist Party Secretary Qin Guangrong said on 4 March that he had targeted sufficient resources to help the victims, who would not have to bear medical costs. Emergency services had processed the injured, and compensation arrangements were being discussed. Qin said that the absence of clear threat up to that point meant terrorism prevention had not been a high priority in Yunnan. He admitted to inadequacies in resources, policing and intelligence gathering.

Attackers 
On 3 March the Ministry of Public Security announced that police had arrested three suspects and said that an eight-person terrorist group was responsible for the attack, the leader of which was named Abdurehim Kurban. Voice of America, a broadcaster overseen by the U.S. Agency for Global Media, an agency of the United States government, claimed that there had been scant information from official sources as to the identities, or even evidence that the attackers were Uyghurs.

Qin Guangrong said that the captured wounded suspect had confessed to the crime. He asserted the group started off in Yunnan and originally planned to participate in "jihad" abroad. They allegedly tried unsuccessfully to leave the country from south Yunnan, and also from Guangdong. Unable to do so, they returned to Yunnan, and carried out the attack. Sources from Radio Free Asia, another broadcaster that is under the supervision of the U.S. Agency for Global Media, seem to confirm that they were Uyghurs, saying the gang most likely originated from a township in Hotan, Xinjiang, where it was claimed that police had violently suppressed a demonstration against the closure of a mosque and the arrest of its imam in June 2013 that ended in 15 dead and 50 injured. The sources claimed that after witnessing the capture of fellow Uyghurs attempting to flee China into Laos, the group became desperate because of their lack of identity papers along with being on the run from police.

The surviving wounded suspect, a pregnant woman, Patigul Tohti, and three men, Iskandar Ehet, Turgun Tohtunyaz and Hasayn Muhammad, who were accused of masterminding the attack and had been arrested while attempting to flee across the border two days before the attack, were tried for and convicted of murder and organizing and leading a terrorist organization in the Kunming City Intermediate People's Court. Tohti was sentenced to life in prison, while Ehet, Tohtunyaz, and Muhammad received death sentences, and were executed in March 2015.

Reactions

Domestic
After the terrorist attack, Chinese Communist Party (CCP) general secretary Xi Jinping and Premier Li Keqiang assigned Meng Jianzhu, Secretary of the Central Politics and Law Commission, to oversee the investigation. There was some coverage in the regional press; local Kunming Times carried the story on its front page. But the South China Morning Post (SCMP) remarked that the China Central Television evening news programme as well as other national media did not report the attack. Coverage was also scant in the Southern Metropolis Daily in Guangzhou and the Yangtse Evening Post. 

As a result, it became a heavily discussed topic on Chinese social media, where responses ranged from anger and shock to restraint. Whilst China Daily noted the appeals by netizens to "stop circulating bloody pictures", microblogged and social media-hosted images of the carnage were swiftly deleted by censors. Several Sina Weibo users also referred to the incident as our "9-11"; and the CCP-owned tabloid Global Times echoed the sentiment with a headline titled, "Nothing justified civilian slaughter in China's '9-11'". Jin Canrong of Renmin University suggested the way forward would be to de-emphasise Uyghur ethnicity and try to instill a greater sense of "Chineseness", stressing equal obligations and rights as Chinese citizens, while Barry Sautman, a China expert at the Hong Kong University of Science and Technology, suggested widening the preferential policies and granting Xinjiang Uyghurs greater autonomy.

The SCMP suggested the attack had taken place at the most politically sensitive time of year, which was on the eve of the second session of the National Committee of the Chinese People's Political Consultative Conference. Lü Xinhua, spokesman for the conference, denounced the attack as a serious violent terrorist attack planned and organized by terrorist elements from Xinjiang. This assertion has been echoed by officials in Kunming.

A Legal Daily video clip that broadcast on CCTV News on 3 March featured an interview with the SWAT marksman who was responsible for shooting five of the attackers and applauded his heroism. The officer said that as the assailants rushed towards him ignoring warning shots fired, he shot the five in about 15 seconds "without thinking". Sautman said that the government may have wanted to "show that there was also successful resistance to terrorists and to put a human face on that resistance."

Western media coverage 

Following the event, many major Western media outlets covered the event with the quotation marks around the word "terrorism," some in the article's headline, some in the body, and some in both. China accused Western commentators, with their focus on Uyghur rights, of hypocrisy and double standards on terrorism. Chinese citizens followed that with criticism against the United States government for refusing to identify the rampage as a terrorist attack, with some comparing it against the Chinese response to the Boston Marathon bombing.

The People's Daily, the official newspaper of the Central Committee of the Chinese Communist Party, accused Western media of ambivalence and failing to state unequivocally that the attack was an act of terrorism, saying, "These media are always the loudest when it comes to anti-terrorism, but in the Kunming train station terrorist violence they lost their voice and spoke confusedly, making people angry," and named American news outlets CNN, The Associated Press, The New York Times and The Washington Post as examples.

CNN removed the quotation marks on 2 March, one day after the event, describing it as "deadly Kunming terror attacks".

International
The UN Secretary-General Ban Ki-moon and the Security Council separately condemned the attack. Many countries condemned the attack, and expressed their deepest sympathy and condolences. Dilxat Rexit, a spokesman for the World Uyghur Congress, deplored the attacks, and urged the Chinese government to "ease systematic repression". The Diplomat pointed to use of the comparison to 9–11 as referring not so much to the scale of the attack but the effect that this would have on the nation's psyche, saying "there are hints that it may have a similar effect on the way China conceptualizes and deals with terrorism". An academic at the National University of Singapore warned of a very significant impact of the incident on the Chinese public as the attack took place in the heart of China, and not at the periphery, making the people more inclined to support the adoption of a more hard-line approach towards Xinjiang or Uyghurs, thus accelerating the cycle of repression and violence.

Rebiya Kadeer, President of the World Uyghur Congress, called on the Chinese government to rationally handle the attacks and "not to demonize Uighur people as enemies of the state". The Chinese Foreign Ministry spokesman Qin Gang responded by condemning the WUC as "an anti-China separatist organization", saying that the WUC "cannot represent Uyghur people" and that Kadeer "showed her ulterior political motive by linking the terrorist incidents at Kunming together with a particular ethnic group".

The Daily Telegraph mentioned that this was the first time Uyghurs had been blamed for carrying out an attack of such magnitude outside of Xinjiang. Adjunct professor of Sinology at the Chinese University of Hong Kong Willy Lam said that official figures indicate violent conflicts appear to be on the increase. He suggested the absence of a mechanism for airing grievances and dialogue between the aggrieved and the authorities is contributing to the increase in those resorting to violence. The Analects column of The Economist asserted that although the alleged group leader's name suggests he may be a Uyghur, this would be difficult to verify in a country where media are state-controlled and officials tightly control information flows. It responded to Chinese commentators who criticised outsiders for not immediately accepting official Chinese assertion of an act of politically motivated terrorism by Xinjiang separatists by saying: "But China, which prefers to play down the role of its policies in Xinjiang in generating discontent, has long sought to discredit its Uygur critics by linking them to terrorism". The Economist also mentioned "Chinese oppression in Xinjiang" that "hit at the heart of Uighur identity" as a factor in the escalating violence, including: "students are banned from fasting during Ramadan, religious teaching for children is restricted, and Uighur-language education is limited". Yet according to Dawn, China only discourages fasting for Uygur Muslims and encourages people to eat properly for study and work but authorities "don't force anyone to eat during Ramadan". Rohan Gunaratna, a terrorism expert at Nanyang Technological University, Singapore, said there had been intelligence failure. He estimated that "in the last 12 months there have been over 200 attacks [in Xinjiang], maybe even more. It is getting worse".

Notes

References

Xinjiang conflict
Attacks in China in 2014
Events in Yunnan
Mass murder in 2014
Mass stabbings in China
Terrorist incidents in China in 2014
Terrorist incidents in China
Terrorist incidents involving knife attacks
Stabbing attacks in 2014
Deaths by stabbing in China
Attacks on railway stations
Turkistan Islamic Party
March 2014 events in China
Knife attacks
Massacres in China
Terrorist incidents on railway systems in Asia
2014 murders in China